Albert Dorfman (1916–1982) was an American biochemical geneticist, notable for discovery of the cause of Hurler's syndrome.
 He was also noted for his contributions to vaccine against Streptococcus infections.

He also contributed to advances against rheumatic fever.
Dorfman was a member of the National Academy of Sciences, Director of the La Rabida University, Chairman of the Department of Pediatrics of the University of Chicago, Director of the Joseph P. Kennedy, Jr. Mental Retardation Research Center, Richard T. Crane Distinguished Service Professor of Pediatrics and Biochemistry.

Life and career 
Dorfman was born and grew up in Chicago.
Dorfman received his B.S. degree in 1936, a Ph.D. degree in 1939, and an M.D. degree in 1944 – all from the University of Chicago.
 1948 – becomes an assistant professor of Pediatrics at the University of Chicago
 1957 – becomes Professor of Pediatrics and Biochemistry
 1957–1972 – he serves as Director of the La Rabida University of Chicago Institute
 1962–1972 – he serves as Chairman of the Department of Pediatrics
 1967 – July 27, 1982 – he was Director of the Joseph P. Kennedy, Jr. Mental Retardation Research Center and the Richard T. Crane Distinguished Service Professor of Pediatrics and Biochemistry

His brother was Ralph Dorfman.

References

External links 

 Nancy B. Schwartz and Leonard Roden, "Albert Dorfman", Biographical Memoirs of the National Academy of Sciences (1997)

1916 births
1982 deaths
American geneticists
American pediatricians
Jewish American scientists
Members of the United States National Academy of Sciences
Scientists from Chicago
University of Chicago alumni
University of Chicago faculty
20th-century American physicians
Pritzker School of Medicine alumni
20th-century American Jews
Members of the National Academy of Medicine